Ivan Yevgenyevich Starkov (born 10 January 1986) is a former football player from Russia. His position was left midfielder.

Honours
 Russian Premier League bronze: 2006.

External links
Profile on Official FC Amkar Website 

1986 births
Living people
Sportspeople from Barnaul
Russian footballers
Russia under-21 international footballers
FC Lokomotiv Moscow players
FC Rostov players
FC Amkar Perm players
Russian Premier League players
FC Khimki players
FC SKA-Khabarovsk players
FC Dynamo Barnaul players
Association football midfielders
FC Neftekhimik Nizhnekamsk players
FC Baikal Irkutsk players